This article shows all participating team squads at the European Qualification Tournament for the 2016 Men's Olympic Volleyball Tournament, held in Germany from 4 to 9 January 2016.

















See also
 Volleyball at the 2016 Summer Olympics – Women's European qualification squads

References

External links
Official website
Process

2016 in volleyball
Volleyball qualification for the 2016 Summer Olympics
Olympic men's volleyball squads